Identicide is the deliberate, systematic and targeted destruction of the places, symbols, objects, including ideas, values and aesthetica, and other cultural property that represent the identity of a people, with the intent to erase the cultural narrative and memory of that people, demoralize a population, absorb it into another cultural/political verity, or to rid an area of that people altogether.  

Examples of identicide can be observed in the destruction of the Bridge of Mostar and the National and University Library in Bosnia and Herzegovina, and the willful damage of Islamic iconography and archaeological treasures such as Palmyra by ISIL in Syria. 

Identicide offers a way to frame some of the destructive acts that precede genocide. The international convention on Genocide does not include this predictive framework. Genocidal acts must have already taken place for a situation to be legally termed "genocide." Because it cannot be named as such until after the fact, earlier intentional and destructive acts are often termed ‘potential genocide’ or ‘possible genocide’. Identicide is a term that captures the force of pre-genocidal acts and is a phenomenon unto itself.   

In being a series of acts or pre-emptive stages of genocide or as an alternative to genocide, identicide incorporates many of the other more specific phenomena and related activities ending in “-cide”, including ethnocide, topocide, terracide, democide, memoricide, urbicide, gendercide, gynocide, sociocide and domicide. These other -cides are elements that contribute to cultural identity, denoting the destruction of a part or aspect of it. Identicide determines the destruction of the whole.

Identity 
Perpetrators of identicide understand that cultural identity is built into places created over centuries of living in place, and a marginalized group can be weakened and unalterably changed through the destruction of their places. The destruction results in people leaving their places, or a loss of distinctiveness in place, and can achieve the result intended by the perpetrators. 

According to Meharg, identicide is a deliberate act, normally performed as a tactic of armed conflict, but more specifically is

Identicide can be a precursor to genocide but does not necessarily result in genocide.

Etymology 
The term was coined in 1998 by Sarah Jane Meharg, Ph.D. while completing her studies at the Royal Military College of Canada. It was later published in her Masters of Arts (War Studies) thesis in 1999.

Cultural geography 
Identicide, as argued by Meharg, is centered around erasing the link between people and their places, in order to weaken cultural identity and create anomie.  These roots of identity are not only embedded within the people who inhabit a certain region, but also among the cultural infrastructure (i.e. castles, houses, engineering feats, routes/paths, bridges etc.), symbols (i.e. monuments, statues), signs, language (i.e. any form of literature, libraries), and social behaviors that support the functionality and cohesiveness a given community and contribute to their uniqueness and specificity that could be recalled, affecting the memory of their unique heritage, historical power and environment and ethnic leverage in a region over time.  The continued presence of such material and places allow a people’s identity to continue to live on, whether those people still exist, have evolved or have been eliminated, and as such their identity remains preserved in the memory of mankind and society.  Such examples include monuments and statues, which “are best thought of as devices of communication rather than aesthetic representations: as such, they underscore…the ‘reworking of memory.’”

Armed conflict 
The tactics involved in identicide involve those that eliminate the bond between places and people, to include (but not restricted to) the burning of libraries and literature, the bombing of symbolic and sacred sites, as well as the appropriation of the vernacular places that have no military importance during conflict with the exception that a group of people is rooted to these places and material and identifies with them. 

The co-opting of place by identity groups is a threat to the status quo during conflicts, and it becomes a tactical approach to destroy that which represents identity (beliefs, ways, practices, rituals) and which inspires them as a people; this last point contributes to the end objective of sustaining gains in warfare by a belligerent by eliminating the ability of an enemy to retaliate in destroying its will through erasing its identity. Belligerents seek to systematically destroy identity elements, causing anomie and other behavioral and attitudinal reactions, which can result in the group moving away, or submitting to control.

Peace 
Identicide can take many forms, where the intense killing of a people in a short amount of time, as well as the physical destruction of its link with a place or region, are the more recognizable acts that fall within its scope.  However, longer term and more subtle acts, such as absorbing and integrating a culture within another through the transformation of religion, language, and social practices, or imposing/preventing demographic shifts within a community, with a final outcome to deliberately eliminate the remnants of a specific people and their landscape, could also be viewed as forms of identicide.

Implementation 
Identicide includes willful acts of destruction of the places, symbols, objects and other cultural property that represents the identity of a people, with the intent to erase the cultural narrative of that people in a particular region over time. Targets are often "symbolic landscapes" that, according to Sarah Jane Meharg, "create a particularity of place, [and] also act as narratives of collective memory that underpin the cohesion and identity of groups."

Examples 
The destruction of National and University Library of Sarajevo, Bosnia and Herzegovina. 

The destruction of Stari Most, Bosnia and Herzegovina.

The destruction of the Bamiyan Buddhas, Afghanistan

Renaming of Mauri place names, New Zealand

Renaming of English and French place names in Montreal, Canada

References

Genocide